Puente Genil is a Spanish city in the province of Córdoba, autonomous community of Andalusia. It is situated about 45 miles (70 km) from the provincial capital, Córdoba. It has a population of around 30,000 people.

Etymology
The name of the town comes from the bridge over the river Genil.

Description
The town is an agricultural centre, also known for its Semana Santa celebration, contracted in the local vernacular to "mananta".

Transport
Puente Genil is served by Puente Genil-Herrera railway station, around 4 km from the town centre on the AVE high-speed rail line from Madrid to Málaga.

References

External links

Municipalities in the Province of Córdoba (Spain)